Don Rehfeldt (January 7, 1927 – October 16, 1980) was an American basketball player. He was the second overall pick in the 1950 NBA draft by the Baltimore Bullets from the Wisconsin Badgers.

Basketball career

He was a graduate of Amundsen High School in Chicago and went on to become a two time Big Ten (then Western Conference) leading scorer in 1949 and 1950 and the Big Ten MVP in 1950 at Wisconsin. He was also a first-team All-American in 1950. Don is a charter member of the University of Wisconsin–Madison Athletic Hall of Fame, elected in 1991. He is also a member of the Illinois Public League Hall of Fame and the Illinois Basketball Coaches Hall of Fame. He was most noted for his hook shot.

During the 1946–1947 season, Rehfeldt returned from World War II and sparked a rally against Minnesota that lead to a Big Ten Championship for the Badgers and a berth in the NCAA Elite Eight. Rehfeldt averaged 11.2 points per game as a sophomore in 1947–1948 as Wisconsin was 12–8 under Coach Bud Foster. He then averaged 17.3 points and Wisconsin was 12–10 in 1948–1949. As a senior in 1949–1950, Rehfeldt averaged 19.8 points, as Wisconsin finished 17–5.

Overall, Rehfeldt averaged 16.3 points in 64 games at Wisconsin, scoring 1169 career points.

Upon graduation in 1950, Rehfeldt was the Badgers' all-time leading scorer and held 14 other individual records. He was the first Badger to score 1,000 points. He held the Badger record as its last All-American for 56 years until Alando Tucker was named a First Team All-American in 2007.

After graduation, Rehfeldt played in the "World Series of Basketball", which was a nationwide tour that matched College All-Americans against the Harlem Globetrotters. He was the leading scorer on that tour. His teammates included top 50 all time NBA players Paul Arizin and Bob Cousy.

NBA career
Rehfeldt was the second overall pick in the 1950 NBA draft by the Baltimore Bullets.

In his NBA career, Rehfeldt averaged 7.0 points and 4.2 rebounds in 69 games with the Baltimore Bullets. On November 29, 1951 he was sold by the Bullets to the Milwaukee Hawks. He averaged 7.1 points and 6.0 rebounds in 29 games with the Hawks.

Personal life
Rehfeldt was also an avid bridge player and achieved the rank of Life Master along with his wife, Joyce.

He served nearly 16 years on the board of education of Wisconsin Rapids, Wisconsin.

Rehfeldt died on October 16, 1980 at age 53 of cancer.

Honors and awards
 Big Ten Conference Most Valuable Player in 1950
 First Team All-American 1950
 First Team All-Big Ten, 1949 & 1950
 2nd Team All-Big Ten 1948
 Big Ten leading Scorer, 1949 & 1950
 Charter member of the University of Wisconsin–Madison Athletic Hall of Fame (1991).
 First Badger to score 1000 points
 Elected to the IBCA/Basketball Museum of Illinois Hall of Fame in 1974
 Elected to the Chicago Public League Hall of Fame – May 2009
 Finished his Badger Career with 14 of 28 Individual Scoring Records

External links
NBA statistics

References

1927 births
1980 deaths
20th-century American politicians
All-American college men's basketball players
American men's basketball players
Baltimore Bullets (1944–1954) draft picks
Baltimore Bullets (1944–1954) players
Deaths from cancer in Wisconsin
Milwaukee Hawks players
People from Wisconsin Rapids, Wisconsin
Power forwards (basketball)
School board members in Wisconsin
Wisconsin Badgers men's basketball players
Basketball players from Chicago